The Narrow Path is a 2006 Nigerian film, produced and directed by Tunde Kelani.
The film was adapted from The Virgin, a novel written by Bayo Adebowale.

Plot summary
The film follows the story of Awero, a young woman living in the village of Orita South-West Nigeria during the colonial era. Awero was a beautiful virgin whom all the men in the village want to marry. She was involved in a love triangle-esque relationship between Odejimi a brave hunter and Lapade a rich jewellery merchant. She later accepted to marry Odejimi a brave hunter from another village but was raped by Dauda her childhood friend before her traditional ceremony.

However, a dark secret is revealed on their wedding night, causing a rift between the villages of Orita and Agbade and bringing them to the brink of war.

In the end, the conflict is resolved by a group of village women, led by Awero, who advocate for the cancellation of virginity tests in all the villages. The film features the beautiful Yoruba country's rich art and culture . It includes a soundtrack called Ikoko Akufo (Lamentations for a broken pot) by Beautiful Nubia that was later included in his Essential Work Album.

Cast
Sola Asedeko as Awero
Segun Adefila as Dauda
Ayo Badmus as Lapade
Seyi Fasuyi as Odejimi
Khabirat Kafidipe
Joke Muyiwa
Olu Okekanye
Eniola Olaniyan

References

2006 films
Films based on Nigerian novels
Nigerian drama films
English-language Nigerian films